James Rhodes (27 July 1866 – 26 August 1939) was an English cricketer active in 1890s. Born at Aston, Warwickshire, Rhodes was a right-handed batsman.

Rhodes made his debut in first-class cricket for Warwickshire against Derbyshire at Edgbaston in the 1895 County Championship, with him making two further appearances in what was his only season of first-class cricket. He scored 89 runs in his three first-class matches, top-scoring with 64, made on debut.

He died at Solihull, Warwickshire on 26 August 1939.

References

External links
James Rhodes at ESPNcricinfo

1866 births
1939 deaths
Cricketers from Birmingham, West Midlands
English cricketers
Warwickshire cricketers
English cricketers of 1890 to 1918